Eucosma is a very large genus of moths belonging to the family Tortricidae. Some taxonomies place a number of species in the genus Eucopina (e. g.: E. bobana, E. cocana, E. tocullionana). The genus has a Holarctic and Indomalayan distribution (some Afrotropical species originally described in this genus have since been reassigned to other genera  ). Even in well-studied Europe and North America, new species are still regularly discovered (Nomina Insecta Nearctica lists 150 Nearctic species and Fauna Europaea lists 53 European species). There are at least 670 described species in Eucosma worldwide.

These are small moths in a wide variety of colours, sometimes plain, sometimes with bold patterning.

See also
 List of Eucosma species

References

External links
Tortricidae.com

Eucosmini
Tortricidae genera
Taxa named by Jacob Hübner